Pakistan is a federal parliamentary republic in South Asia on crossroads of Central Asia and Western Asia. Economists estimate that Pakistan has been part of the wealthiest region of the world throughout the first millennium CE having the largest economy by GDP. This advantage was lost in the 18th century as other regions edged forward such as China and Western Europe. 

Pakistan is considered as a developing country and is one of the Next Eleven, the eleven countries that, along with the BRICs, have a high potential to become the world's largest economies in the 21st century. However, after decades of social instability, serious deficiencies in macromanagement and unbalanced macroeconomics in basic services such as train transportation and electrical energy generation had developed. The economy is considered to be semi-industrialized, with centres of growth along the Indus River. The diversified economies of Karachi and Punjab's urban centres coexist with less developed areas in other parts of the country particularly in Balochistan. According to the Economic complexity index, Pakistan is the 67th largest export economy in the world and the 106th most complex economy. During the fiscal year 2015–16, Pakistan's exports stood at US$20.81 billion and imports at US$44.76 billion, resulting in a negative trade balance of US$23.96 billion.

For further information on the types of business entities in this country and their abbreviations, see "Business entities in Pakistan".

Notable firms 
This list includes notable companies with primary headquarters located in the country. The industry and sector follow the Industry Classification Benchmark taxonomy. Organizations that have ceased operations are included and noted as defunct.

See also 
 List of banks in Pakistan
 List of hospitals in Pakistan

References

External links 
  

Pakistan